The Visitors were an American rock band that formed in Little Rock, Arkansas in the summer of 1997. They played a brand of rock with very fuzzy tones and emphasized anthemic melodies with prevalent harmonies.  Headed by singer-songwriter Jonathan Berry,  they played many concerts around the state of Arkansas.  After they disbanded guitarist Will Boyd went on to join the band Evanescence and bassist Elliott Walker formed the group Caulfield's Aside.  Berry went on to release a single entitled Hayseed in 2003.  In 2004 Jonathan Berry formed a new lineup under The Visitors name in Austin, Texas.

Origins
The band was started by Jonathan Berry (vocals, guitar) and Jason Lapp (drummer).  Jonathan and Jason had previously played in other projects including 13 O'Clock and one other prior performance under the Visitors moniker.  They acquired the young and talented Elliott Walker to play bass and played their first performance on September 29, 1997 at Vino's in Little Rock.  The Visitors recorded a demo tape that winter and were joined by new guitarist Will Boyd.  Boyd actually agreed to join the band during the recording and so contributed only backing vocals to the demo.  He does appear on the cover.

History and the Gone For Days EP

Throughout 1998 The Visitors continued to play shows to a growing audience, often playing with popular Little Rock metal acts such as Mindrage.  As the summer of 1998 waned, buoyed by the addition of Boyd, The Visitors entered the studio to record the Gone For Days EP.  Included on the cd were 4 new Berry compositions and 1 new Boyd tune, "Valentine's Day".  Also included on the cd erroneously was a track off their demo tape "Some Other Day".  In June, 1999 the band quietly dissolved under conflicting interests within.

The move to Austin, TX

Chief songwriter Jonathan Berry moved to Austin, TX in 2003 to lay groundwork for a new band and write new material.  In late 2003 he travelled to Bryant, AR to record a single entitled Hayseed.  In May 2004 a new lineup emerged with the help of new drummer Mark Evans and bassist Sean Angeles.  After playing scattered shows for months they disbanded at the end of 2005.

Lineup

(1997-1999 - Little Rock, AR)
Jonathan Berry - vocals, guitar
Will Boyd - guitar, vocals
Elliott Walker - bass
Jason Lapp - drums

(2004-2005 - Austin, TX)
Jonathan Berry - vocals, guitar
Seth Truett - guitar, vocals
Sean Angeles - bass
Mark Evans - drums

Releases

External links
VisitorsRock.com - Official website

Rock music groups from Arkansas
Musical groups established in 1997
Musical groups from Austin, Texas
1997 establishments in Arkansas
Musical groups from Little Rock, Arkansas
Rock music groups from Texas